Robin Bennett is a British entrepreneur, writer, and documentary producer. He is the founder of The Bennett Group, including Aktuel Translations, a global translation company, London Tutors, River Consulting, Comp Kennels, 1155 (Charity) and Monster Books, an independent publishing house. He is the great-nephew of Hilda Harding, Britain's first female bank manager.

Bennett Group 

Robin Bennett attended Royal Holloway and graduated in 1992 with a degree in Modern Languages.

Translation company Aktuel Translations was founded in 1992 as part of the Bennett Group and provides technical translations to corporate businesses.

Other companies in the Bennett Group include London Tutors, thisisplanetearth.com, Quarto Translations, which provides translations for publishers, and Patent Translations International, which provides patent translations for legal services.

Robin has also spoken at UK universities and at conferences about how to start up a new business.

Monster Books 

Robin Bennett founded independent publishing house Monster Books in 1997. He has written numerous books for both children and adults.

Publications

Non Fiction Books 

 Start-up Smart (2010)
 How to Make a Good Living Running Your Own Business (2012)
 Kicking the Property Ladder (2012)
 Life's a Banquet (2020)
 Rampaging Rugby (2021)

Fiction Books 

 Creake Castle: The Pepper King (2007)
 Creake Castle: Tobias Brown, Inventor Esquire (2007)
 Creake Castle: Miles Byfar and the Christmas Spirit (2011)
 Small Vampires: Picus the Thief (2011)
 The Angel of Mons (2013)
 Small Vampires: Mousch the Crooked (2013)
 Iron Knights (2013)
 Small Vampires: Raptor the Avenger (2015)
 The Hairy Hand (2019)
 Space Dragons (2019)
 Monster Max (2021)
 XII (2022)

Picture Books 

 Fairy Tales and Other (1997)
 Nervus Rex (2002)
 Bad Boris (2007)
 Bullets and Bones (2007)
 Pippin and the Moon (2007)
 Quincy Duff and the Tangley Lane Trio (2007)
 SPLAT! (2018)

Audiobooks 

 Buk (2013), narrated by Imogen Stubbs

Films 

 Fantastic Britain (2016), writer and producer

Accolades 

Robin Bennett was listed in the Who's Who of British Business in 2003.

His novel Picus the Thief was longlisted for the British Fantasy Award 2012  and won the Writer Magazine Indie Book of the Year Award 2012.

His children's book The Hairy Hand was longlisted for The Times/Chicken House Children's Fiction Competition 2013.

In May 2016 his documentary "Fantastic Britain", about the British obsession with magic and folklore, won an "Award of Excellence" at the Hollywood International Independent Documentary Awards (HIIDA).

References 

British businesspeople
Writers about England
Living people
Year of birth missing (living people)
Alumni of Royal Holloway, University of London